Minjibir is a Local Government Area in Kano State, Nigeria. Its headquarters are in the town of Minjibir, about 20 km northeast of the state capital Kano.

It has an area of 416 km and a population of 213,794 at the 2006 census.

The postal code of the area is 702.

Minjibir was historically known as a center of textile production, particularly handweaving, which was formerly a source of livelihood for most households. Along with the surrounding villages, Minjibir was known for producing white wide strip-woven bullam, blue-black bunu, and black-white checked saƙi cloths. The town's proximity to the city of Kano facilitated commerce. In 1949, a large workshop was set up in Minjibir by the Kano Native Authority; it was called the Kano Textile Training Center. This subsequently closed down. Later, Minjibir handweavers set up their own dye pits in order to bypass professional dyers and thus turn a higher profit. When Ashiru Abdullahi visited Minjibir in 2018, he found that handweaving is no longer done in Minjibir itself, but rather in the outlying village of Gidan Gabas. Their main customers are traditional rulers as well as participants in horseback processions following Eid al-Fitr and Eid al-Kabir. While the handweaving of strip-woven cloths has steeply declined in Nigeria since the 1970s, Abdullah noted that a number of young men worked as handweavers in Gidan Gabas, thus keeping the tradition alive in the area.

References

Local Government Areas in Kano State